Bicyclus dentata, the dentate bush brown, is a butterfly in the family Nymphalidae. It is found in western and central Kenya, western Uganda, Tanzania, Rwanda, Burundi and the Democratic Republic of the Congo. The habitat consists of semi-montane and montane forests.

Adults are attracted to fermenting fruit.

References

Elymniini
Butterflies described in 1898
Butterflies of Africa
Taxa named by Emily Mary Bowdler Sharpe